Nathaniel White Harper (18 March 1865 – 3 January 1954) was an Australian politician and businessman. He was a member of the Western Australian Legislative Assembly from 1910 until 1914, representing the seats of Beverley and Pingelly. He was also the maternal grandfather of politicians David Grayden and Bill Grayden, the latter of whom served for almost 50 years in State and Federal politics.

Biography
Harper was born near Ballymena, Northern Ireland, to John Harper, a farmer, and Margaret (née White), and was educated locally for six months in the year while working on his father's potato fields. In 1883, he moved to New Zealand where he worked in a gold mine in the Central Otago region and gaining experience in hydraulic sluicing. In 1887, he commenced work with BHP in Broken Hill, where he rose to the position of mine foreman. Two years later, he moved once again to Zeehan, Tasmania, where he worked as a mine manager while also being the vice-president of the local miners' union. On 19 September 1891, he married Margaret Jane Thomas at her family home at Naseby, New Zealand, then in 1892 moved to Southern Cross, Western Australia, as manager of Fraser's mine. In May 1895, he took up management of the White Feather Main Reef at Kanowna, and in 1897, after an unsuccessful attempt the previous year, was elected mayor of the town, a position he would hold until 1901. Also in 1897, at the state election held that year, he ran unsuccessfully against Frederick Vosper for the North-East Coolgardie seat.

References

Further reading
  (137 pages)

1865 births
1954 deaths
Members of the Western Australian Legislative Assembly
Burials at Karrakatta Cemetery
Irish emigrants to colonial Australia
People from Ballymena
Australian mining engineers
Irish emigrants to New Zealand (before 1923)